Calophyllum vexans is a species of flowering plant in the Calophyllaceae family. It is found in Indonesia and Papua New Guinea.

References

vexans
Trees of the Maluku Islands
Trees of Papuasia
Least concern plants
Taxonomy articles created by Polbot